Cains is a law firm based in Douglas, Isle of Man.

It was founded in 1899.

Prior to the Great Recession, the firm concentrated on high-value capital markets, principally the AIM listing of Indian businesses.  Following a series of ad hoc redundancies in 2008 and 2009, it presently has 24 lawyers, of whom 6 are directors (partners).

It is rated as tier 1 by both Legal 500 and Chambers legal directories

Cains won the 2007 Legal Week award and the 2008 Lawyer award for top offshore law firm.

The firm is regulated by the Isle of Man Law Society.

References

External links
 
Chambers and Partners Firm Profile

Offshore law firms
Manx law
Law firms established in 1899
Organisations based in the Isle of Man